Bowman is an unincorporated community in Placer County, California. It lies at an elevation of 1617 feet (493 m).

The Bowman post office opened in 1893. The name honors Harry Hoisington Bowman, fruit grower.

References

Unincorporated communities in Placer County, California
Unincorporated communities in California